Robert Kemeys Thomas  (born 25 September 1941), also known as Bob Thomas, is a physical chemist working in the Physical and Theoretical Chemistry Laboratory (PTCL) at the University of Oxford.

Early life and education
He was born in Harpenden, the son of the Rev. Herbert Samuel Griffiths Thomas MC and Dr Agnes Paterson Thomas (née McLaren). He was educated at St John's College, Oxford.

Career and research
He is a fellow of University College, Oxford. He works in the field of soft condensed matter and is a pioneer in the development of neutron scattering and reflectivity techniques. He was elected a Fellow of the Royal Society in 1998.
 Surfaces and Interfaces Award (2010)

Personal life
He married Pamela Woods in 1968. They have three children.

References

1941 births
People from Harpenden
Fellows of the Royal Society
Fellows of University College, Oxford
Living people
British physical chemists